Jacalyn M. Duffin  (born 1950) is a Canadian medical historian and hematologist. She held the Hannah Chair, History of Medicine at Queen's University from 1988 until 2017. Formerly, she was president of the American Association for the History of Medicine and Canadian Society for the History of Medicine. From 1993–1995 she was Associate Dean Undergraduate Studies and Education at Queen's University. She is most well known for her testimony which led to the canonization of Marie-Marguerite d'Youville. As of 2010, she has published eight books (as author and editor) on the history of medicine and has written numerous articles on various subjects relating to the history of medicine, miracles, and hematology. In 2019, Duffin was inducted into the Canadian Medical Hall of Fame.

Biography

Education
Duffin completed her MD from the University of Toronto. Soon after this, she moved to Paris, where she elected to study hematology and René Laennec at the Sorbonne. She completed her PhD in the History of Medicine in 1985, she then returned to Canada.

Vatican testimony
Upon her return to Canada, Duffin settled in Ottawa, where she took on a contract to review a set of slides, which she assumed were to be used in a malpractice suit. She was given no information about the patient, but identified the young woman as suffering from acute myeloblastic leukemia, "the most aggressive leukemia known." As the slides were from some 5+ years earlier, she assumed the patient as deceased, as that form of leukemia kills usually within two years.
Instead, she found that the patient had, after a relapse, gone into remission and was doing well some five years on. Duffin's testimony was to be used by the Vatican to determine whether Marie-Marguerite d'Youville (1701–1771) had performed a miracle and was worthy of canonization. According to Duffin, "They never asked me to say this was a miracle. They wanted to know if I had a scientific explanation for why this patient was still alive. I realized they weren’t asking me to endorse their beliefs. They didn’t care if I was a believer or not, they cared about the science."

Works 
 Langstaff: A Nineteenth-Century Medical Life, University of Toronto Press, 1993; London: Macmillan; reprinted 1999
 To See with a Better Eye: A Life of R.T.H. Laennec, Princeton University Press, 1998.
 History of Medicine: A Scandalously Short Introduction
 1st edition, University of Toronto Press, 1999; Macmillan, 2000; Korean translation, 2006
 2nd revised and expanded ed., U Toronto Press, 2010
 Lovers and Livers: Disease Concepts in History. The Joanne Goodman Lectures, 2002, University of Toronto Press, 2005
 Medical Miracles: Doctors, Saints and Healing in the Modern World, Oxford University Press, 2009
 Medical Saints: Cosmas and Damian in a Postmodern World, Oxford University Press, 2013.

Translator 

Grmek, Mirko D., History of AIDS: Emergence and Origin of a Modern Pandemic, Princeton University Press, 1990 (translation of Histoire du sida [1989], with Russell C. Maulitz)

Editor 

Clio in the Clinic: History in Medical Practice, Oxford University Press, 2005.
SARS in Context: Memory, History, and Policy, with Arthur Sweetman, 2006.

Honours 
 2019 Inductee, Canadian Medical Hall of Fame
 2013 Fellow of the Canadian Academy of Health Sciences
 2012 Fellow of the Royal Society of Canada
 2007 Distinguished International Scholar, University of Pennsylvania
 2007 Alpha Omega Alpha Visiting Professor, University of Chicago
 2021 Member of the Order of Canada

References

External links
 Jacalyn Duffin

1950 births
Living people
Canadian medical historians
University of Toronto alumni
Fellows of the Royal Society of Canada
Canadian women academics
Academic staff of Queen's University at Kingston
Canadian women historians